Manoradham is a 1978 Indian Malayalam film, directed by P. Gopikumar and produced by K. H. Khan Sahib. The film stars P. Bhaskaran, Sharada, Sankaradi and K. P. Ummer in the lead roles. The film has musical score by V. Dakshinamoorthy.

Cast
P. Bhaskaran 
Sharada 
Sankaradi 
K. P. Ummer 
Ravi Menon 
Seema 
Vidhubala

Soundtrack

References

External links
 

1978 films
1970s Malayalam-language films
Films directed by P. Gopikumar